Ormond College is the largest of the residential colleges of the University of Melbourne located in the city of Melbourne, Victoria, Australia. It is home to around 350 undergraduates, 90 graduates and 35 professorial and academic residents.

History

Beginnings
The University of Melbourne was established by an act of the Parliament of Victoria in 1853.  were set aside for residential colleges, of which  each were allotted to the Anglican, Presbyterian, Methodist and Roman Catholic denominations. The Presbyterian allotment became Ormond College.

At the end of August 1877, Alexander Morrison, headmaster of Scotch College and convenor of the Presbyterian Church assembly's committee to "watch over the land", received a letter from the director of the Victorian Education Department, proposing that if the church did not mean to take the land for a college, that it be sold and the proceeds divided, half to the church and half to the state for university purposes. This spurred Morrison into action. A subscription list was opened, with a target of £10,000; on this list Francis Ormond's name appears against a donation of £3,000.

The General Assembly meeting in November 1877 resolved that the church should immediately proceed with the building of a college and that £10,000 be raised for the purpose, that the buildings be used as a college of residence for university students and as a theological school. Immediate steps were taken to raise the money. In the course of three years, some £38,000 were raised, of which Francis Ormond contributed £22,571. The foundation stone of the college (now lost) was laid by the Governor of Victoria, George Phipps, 2nd Marquess of Normanby, on 15 November 1879. The formal opening of the college took place on 18 March 1881. At this ceremony it was announced that Francis Ormond had offered to bear the whole cost of the remainder of the planned buildings.

On opening there were 20 students, soon growing to 24. Ormond College was unique amongst University of Melbourne colleges in welcoming students of all faiths and none, a philosophy built upon the Scottish Enlightenment tradition. Students of other Christian denominations, Jewish students and others were welcomed and this has become a cornerstone of the college's inclusive ethos.

In honour of the silver jubilee of Queen Victoria in 1887, Francis Ormond funded the building of the Victoria Wing which came into use in 1889. In 1893 the dining hall, kitchens, staff quarters and the original Master's residence (Allen House) were opened. The neo-Gothic dining hall is reminiscent of an Oxbridge building and is often compared to Hogwarts from J. K. Rowling's Harry Potter; indeed, a Hogwarts-themed episode of MasterChef was filmed there in 2013.

Rapid growth

The rapid growth of the college soon outstripped the available accommodation and Francis Ormond provided funds for the southwest wing, together with a temporary building (which was, however, stone-walled and tin-roofed) where the cloisters now are, which served as kitchens and a dining hall. The next addition to the buildings of the college was the Wyselaskie building, which was completed in March 1887. John Dickson Wyselaskie was a Western District squatter, who also gave generously to the Presbyterian Ladies' College. The building contained a lecture hall and two residences for theological professors and was adapted and divided in 1968 so as to provide for four residences. On 6 July 1887, the portrait of Francis Ormond, which now hangs above the college's dining hall door, was unveiled by Sir James McBain.

In honour of the silver jubilee of Queen Victoria in 1887, Francis Ormond funded the building of the Victoria Wing which came into use in 1889. In 1893 the dining hall, kitchens, staff quarters and the original lodge (Allen House) were opened. On either side of the end window of the hall are effigies representing Francis and Mary Ormond.

Admission of women
From the beginning Ormond accepted women as non-residents, able to attend tutorials and participate in college life whilst living offsite with funding from the college. Female students were amongst its most notable early scholars. Later, from 1968 to 1972, female students were able to live in college in return for waitressing duties and attend tutorials; they were admitted as members of the Ormond College Students' Club in 1969. In 1973, Ormond accepted women students as residents for the first time. Women quickly rose to leadership roles in both the staff and student bodies including being elected chair of the students' club and appointed to the role of vice-master (deputy head of college). The college has a number of distinguished women alumni who have risen to prominence in their fields.

Post WWII expansion
The period after World War II saw great demands for accommodation; for the first time the college passed 150 students. Following an appeal for funds in 1949, a series of improvements were made to Main Building. The kitchens were extensively modernised and general maintenance was brought up to date after the lag resulting from the Depression of the 1930s and the shortages of men and material during and after the War. In 1955, a squash court was built to commemorate the Ormond men who died in the Second World War. A new Master's residence was designed by the prominent architects Grounds, Romberg and Boyd and was completed in 1958. At the same time, a permanent residence was provided for the Vice-Master by the conversion of a rooms of the old lodge (Allen House) and the addition of a semi-circular cream brick building.

Innovation: the 1960s
During the 1960s the college continued to work with Grounds, Romberg and Boyd to create ground-breaking buildings. In the vacation of 1960–61 a new domestic wing was built to accommodate the extra staff and facilities required for the larger college planned for 1962. The three octagon-shaped buildings that constitute Picken Court were built during 1961 and were ready for occupation in 1962, providing accommodation for around 100 students and eight tutors. The chancellor of the university, Sir Arthur Dean, opened the building in March 1962.

1965 saw the erection of the new premises of the MacFarland Library, which were combined with a new theological hall common room. The former library became the chapel, the official opening of which took place on 19 March 1967. For the first time the college had its own place of worship, as befits a church foundation. In 1982 the library was reorganised, separating the Ormond College and Joint Theological College collections.

In 1968, a striking and bold building was opened in the south-east corner of the college grounds in the style later named brutalism. The chancellor of the university, Sir Robert Menzies, officially opened the southeast building and named it McCaughey Court after the master, Davis McCaughey. This building, which caused much comment, won awards for the architects Romberg and Boyd.

Rejuvenation and change
In 1981, the college's centenary was recognised with much pomp and ceremony in the presence of the former master and then Governor of Victoria, Davis McCaughey, whose 20 years of responsibility developed the college in so many ways to its present strength and size. Subsequent building works in the 1980s and 1990s focussed on modernisation and renovation. In the 1980s, bathrooms, the tower, junior common room, the quad and the plaza were all renovated. The current tennis courts were built in 1982 and four Parkville houses were acquired in 1985, housing students for the next twenty years. The 1990s saw the installation of both individual student telephones and network connections. The gym was opened in 1999.

Ormond College was embroiled in controversy in 1991 over allegations that the master of the college had sexually assaulted two female students at a Valedictory party and that the college council had dismissed these complaints out of hand. The master was convicted of one charge of assault, however the conviction was later overturned on appeal, though he resigned his position. The events of this controversy were written into a 1995 book by Helen Garner, The First Stone, which itself was embroiled in controversy over bias toward the master, its criticism of third wave feminism and fictionalisation of various events and circumstances. Since this case, Ormond College has reformed its procedures in regards to sexual harassment and assault.

Innovation and development
In 2009, Rufus Black was appointed master of Ormond College. An ethicist and Rhodes scholar, Black ushered in a new era of change and development.

In 2009, Ormond launched an Indigenous program which supported Aboriginal and Torres Strait Islander students to live at Ormond and study at the University of Melbourne.

In 2016, the college opened the Wade Institute. Established with a gift from entrepreneur Peter Wade, the institute delivers programs for investors, entrepreneurs and schools, including a new University of Melbourne Masters of Entrepreneurship. The degree is a collaboration between Ormond and the university's Faculty of Business and Economics and its School of Engineering.

The college also developed major new facilities during this period. In 2010 the junior common room was redeveloped into cafe style space and lounge. In May 2011 the college opened a $4m student academic centre. The building contains a wide range of formal and informal learning spaces along with the college library and information technology facilities. These facilities are complemented by refurbished tutorial rooms in McCaughey Court and library for the college historical collections in Main Building.

Since 2010 the college has expanded its undergraduate facilities by creating a series of loft rooms in its main building and McCaughey Court. The college has also developed a cohort of graduate students in its two dedicated graduate buildings opened in 2014 and 2015. Perhaps its most significant architectural addition for some decades has been the Wade Institute. The building is Australia's first passivhaus building, constructed to rigorous standards of sustainability and energy efficiency.

In 2018, Lara McKay became master of Ormond, navigating the college through a period of change in the Melbourne student accommodation landscape, enhancing the wellbeing services available to students and leading the college successfully through the challenges of the COVID-19 pandemic.

Gallery

Choir
The Choir of Ormond College was founded in 1982. It was an eight-part choir with twenty four choral scholars, who were both residents and non-residents of the college. From 1982 to 2010 the choir performed and recorded regularly and gave 12 international concert tours of New Zealand, Japan, Singapore and Europe. The choir last toured in 2009, which was to Germany, Austria and Switzerland. At the end of 2010, the choir was formally disbanded. 

In 2011 the college employed Raymond Yong as the director of music and he created a new unauditioned singing group, the Ormond Singers, which remains as an unauditioned group lead by the head of music of the Ormond Students' Club.

Directors 

Douglas Lawrence(1982–2006)
John O'Donnell (2007–2010)
Raymond Yong (2011, of the Ormond Singers)

List of masters
1881–1914 John Henry MacFarland
1915–1943 David Kennedy Picken
(J.C. McPhee, acting master, August 1943 – September 1944)
(The Revd J. E. Owen, acting master, September 1944 – December 1945)
1946–1953 Stanley L. Prescott
1954–1958 Brinley Newton-John
(The Revd John S. Alexander, acting master, 1959)
1959–1979 John Davis McCaughey
1980–1989 David Henry Parker
1990–1993 Alan Gregory
(Kenneth Robin Jackson, acting master, September 1992 – December 1993)
1994–2008 Hugh Norman Collins
2009–2017 Rufus E. R. Black
2018–present Lara McKay

Notable alumni

Politics and government
 Neil Brown – politician and Commonwealth Attorney-General
 John Button – politician and federal government minister
 Sir Littleton Groom- Federal Minister and Speaker in Federal Parliament
 Henry Cohen – State parliamentarian
 Sir Zelman Cowen – 19th Governor General of Australia
 Mark Dreyfus KC – Federal Member for Isaacs, Attorney-General of Australia
 Gareth Evans – Senator, academic and Commonwealth Minister of Foreign Affairs
 Greg Hunt – Federal Member for Flinders, Federal Minister for Health
 Rod Kemp – politician and federal government minister.
 David Kemp – politician and federal government minister.
 John Langmore – Federal politician, academic and diplomat
 Sir John Mackey – state politician
 Sir Robert Menzies – Prime Minister of Australia (Menzies was a non-resident postgraduate law tutor)
 Ian MacFarlan – Premier of Victoria
 Richard Marles – Deputy prime minister of Australia 
 Sir Frank Officer – diplomat
 Madeleine Ogilvie – Tasmanian state politician
 Sir George Oswald Reid – MP and Cabinet Minister
 Roger Shipton – Federal parliamentarian
 Tim Smith – Victorian state politician
 Haddon Storey- politician and Attorney-General of Victoria
 Alan Tudge – Minister for Education
 Vernon Wilcox – Victorian State Transport Minister and Attorney-General

Law
 Kate Jenkins – Federal Sex Discrimination Minister
 Sir Keith Aickin – Justice of the High Court of Australia
 Hilary Charlesworth – Melbourne Laureate Professor at the University of Melbourne, Director of the Centre for International Governance and Justice at the Australian National University.
 Alex Chernov – Supreme Court Justice and Governor of Victoria
 Sir Daryl Dawson – Justice of the High Court of Australia
 Rowan Downing – President of United Nations Dispute Tribunal, UN-appointed judge, Khmer Rouge War Crimes Tribunal, Cambodia & Justice, Court of Appeal, Vanuatu 
 Sir Wilfred Fullagar – Justice of the High Court of Australia
 Kenneth Hayne – Justice of the High Court of Australia
 Sir John Latham – Chief Justice of the High Court of Australia
 Sir George Lush – Supreme Court Justice 
 Sir William Gilbert Stewart McArthur – Justice, Supreme Court of Victoria and Captain, Essendon Football Club
 Alastair Nicholson – Chief Justice, Family Court of Australia
 Sir John Norris – Supreme Court Justice
 Ross Robson- Justice, Supreme Court of Victoria
 Sir Henry Winneke – Supreme Court Justice and Governor of Victoria

Business
 David Crawford – Australian company director
 Sir Peter Derham – business executive, philanthropist
Sir Archibald Glenn – industrialist and Founding Chancellor of La Trobe University
 Charles Goode – director of ANZ Bank, Woodside Petroleum, Singapore Airlines
Sir Ian McLennan – Chairman of BHP 
 Ziggy Switkowski – CEO of Telstra, nuclear physicist, Chancellor of RMIT University

Academia
 Anthony Edward Perry - Fluid dynamicist 
 Robert Bartnik – mathematician
Rufus Black – Vice Chancellor, University of Tasmania
 Sir Frank MacFarlane Burnet – immunologist, Nobel Prize winner
 Hilary Charlesworth – feminist legal academic and judge, International Court of Justice
 Thomas Cherry – pioneering bacteriologist
 Peter Darvall – Vice Chancellor of Monash University
 Sir David Derham – jurist and Vice Chancellor of Melbourne University
 Charles Angas Hurst – mathematical physicist
 Stuart Macintyre – historian, academic and public intellectual
 Neil McQueen – educational innovator, scientist, psychologist and medical doctor
Sir Walter Murdoch- Chancellor of the University of Western Australia, Murdoch University was named in his honour
Sir George Whitecross Paton - Vice-Chancellor of Melbourne University
 E. J. G. Pitman - mathematician
 Ian Renard – Chancellor, University of Melbourne
Sir Lindsay Ride – Vice Chancellor, University of Hong Kong
 Percy Seymour – classicist
 Peter Singer –  philosopher
 Hugh Stretton- historian
 Sir Kenneth Wheare- Vice-Chancellor, Oxford University

Military
 Sir Edward "Weary" Dunlop – Australian World War II hero, surgeon, Wallabies player
 Major General Rupert Downes- soldier, general, surgeon and historian
 Major General "Pompey" Elliott – Senior Officer in Australian Army during WWI, senator, solicitor, VFL footballer, athlete
 Brigadier General William Grant  – engineer, Temporary Brigadier General in First AIF, commanded Australian Light Horse Charge at Beersheba
 General Peter Gration – Chief of the Australian Defence Force
 Sir James McCay – Australian general and politician, champion of women's suffrage and federation
 Stanley Simpson Reid – Australian Rules footballer, Presbyterian minister, Boer War soldier

Medicine
 R. Esme Anderson, early woman ophthalmologist
 Sir Frank MacFarlane Burnet – immunologist, Nobel Prize winner
 Sir Thomas Dunhill – surgeon
 Hilda Esson – doctor
 The Revd John Flynn ("Flynn of the Inland") - founded the Royal Flying Doctor Service of Australia, featured on Australian $20 note 
 Sir John Frew – physician, President of the Royal Australian College of Physicians
 Mary Glowrey – medical missionary, founder of the Catholic Health Association of India
 Effie Stillwell – scholar, missionary doctor in India and winner of the Kaiser-i-Hinde Medal for Public Service.
 Sir Benjamin Rank- plastic surgeon
 Frank I.R. (Skip) Martin AC – endocrinologist, one of the founders of the Australian Diabetes Society, made Member of the Order of Australia in 1995 for his service to medicine, particularly in the field of endocrinology and diabetes

Sport
 Robin Bishop – AFL Commissioner
 Donald Duffy – Chairman, Melbourne Football Club
 Chris Fogarty – Australian Rules footballer, Essendon Football Club
 Charles Littlejohn – Olympic silver medallist, rowing; Rhodes Scholar; Military Cross, WWI
 Stanley Simpson Reid – Australian Rules footballer, Fitzroy Football Club
 Robyn Selby Smith – Three-time world champion and Olympic rower
 Paul Sheahan AM – Australian Test cricketer
 Phoebe Stanley – Olympic rower
 James Sutherland – CEO, Cricket Australia and former Sheffield Shield cricketer for Victoria.

Media and arts
 John Duigan – film director
 Sabrina Herft – Miss Universe Sri Lanka 2012
 David Hobson – principal tenor, Australian Opera
 Peter Nicholson – political cartoonist
 Polixeni Papapetrou – visual artist
 Hannie Rayson – playwright 
 Giselle Rosselli – musician
 Mark Seymour – frontman of Hunters and Collectors
 Phil Harvey (manager) – Manager of Coldplay

Rhodes scholars

John Seitz (1906)
Charles Littlejohn (1909)
Neil MacNeil (1914)
Donald Sandral (1916)
Patrick Hamilton (1917)
William Hancock (1920)
Lindsay Ride (1922)
George Paton (1926)
Kenneth Wheare (1929)
Richard Latham (1931)
Ross Campbell (1933)
Alan Treloar (1940)
Zelman Cowen (1941)
Hugh Stretton (1946)
Alan Serle (1947)
Robert Shaw (1948)
Graeme Davison (1964)
Alistair Christie (1967)
Kenneth Hayne (1969)
Colin Norman (1970)
Graham Hutchinson (1971)
Martin Wardrop (1974)
Andrew Michelmore (1976)
Richard Caro (1978)
Michael Penington (1980)
Ralph King (1982)
Sharon Korman (1983)
Timothy Orton (1986)
Mark Moshinsky (1988)
Mark Chiba (1989)
Rufus Black (1991)
Catherine Anderson (1992)
Joanna Masel (1997)
Kate Brennan (2007)
John Feddersen (2008)
Kate Robson (2008)
Hamish McKenzie (2015)
Bede Jones (2017)
Rebecca Duke (2017)
Brigid O’Farrell-White (2018)
Mattea Mrkusic (2019)

Fulbright scholars

 Zelman Cowen (1936)
 Daryl Dawson (1951)
 Charles Goode (1959)
 Rodney Crewther (1964)
 Bruce McKellar (1973)
 Robert Bartnik (1974)
 Hilary Charlesworth (1974)
 Ted Gott (1981)
 Greg Hunt (1985)
 Fraser Cameron (1995)
 Paul R. Burgess (2009)

References

External links

Ormond College website

Heritage-listed buildings in Melbourne
Presbyterian Church of Australia
Uniting Church in Australia
Residential colleges of the University of Melbourne